Gapi (also Romanized as Gapī, Gepī, and Gappī) is a village in Miankuh Rural District, Chapeshlu District, Dargaz County, Razavi Khorasan Province, Iran. At the 2006 census, its population was 153, in 50 families.

References 

Populated places in Dargaz County